Roger Mathey is an American theatrical director, as well as a playwright, actor, producer, and filmmaker. His plays have been staged in Los Angeles, Orange County, Bakersfield, and San Francisco in California, and also in Denver, Colorado.

Plays
Roger Mathey won the 2002 Los Angeles Drama Critics Circle Award for Direction for the Los Angeles stage production of Trainspotting, and also the 2002 LA Weekly Theater Award for Direction, also for Trainspotting.

Some of the plays he has directed, written, acted in and/or produced are the following: The Time of Your Life, Lysistrata, Escurial, Amadeus, A Hatful of Rain, Beirut, Futon Culture, Naked Twister, Trainspotting, The House of Yes, Cleansed, The White Whore and the Bit Player, You Make Me Physically Ill, Chatsworth, Geeks vs. Zombies, and You Make me Physically Ill: Episode 2 - Love Never Dies.

Mathey's production company is seat of your pants Productions.

Film
Mathey has also written, directed, and produced a short film, Naked Twister.

Film Festival
In addition, Mathey founded the Bakersfield Independent Film Festival (also known as "B.I.F.F.").

References

External links
Official pages
 Seat of Your Pants Productions - Roger Mathey's production company

20th-century American dramatists and playwrights
American theatre directors
American male stage actors
American theatre managers and producers
Living people
1969 births